Toki Tamaru (born February 6, 2002) is a Japanese kickboxer, currently competing in the flyweight division of RISE. He is the current RISE Flyweight champion and former RISE Super Flyweight champion.

As of October 2020, he was the #7 ranked Flyweight in the world by Combat Press. He first entered the rankings in September 2020.

Kickboxing career

RISE super flyweight champion

Early career
He made his RISE debut against Shota Toyama. Toki defeated Toyama by decision. Tamaru had his second fight with RISE during RISE 126, when he fought KING Takeshi. Tamaru beat him by decision. He fought Yuya Hayashi during RISE 127. Tamaru won the fight by decision.

Title reign
Toki faced Azusa Kaneko for the inaugural RISE Super Flyweight championship at RISE 128 on November 2, 2018. Tamaru won the fight by unanimous decision. Two of the judges scored the fight 49–45 in his favor, while the third judge scored bout 50–44 for him. Tamaru knocked Kaneko down once, with a left hook in the third round.

After winning the title, Tamaru faced Kazuki in a non-title bout, at RISE 130 on February 3, 2019. Tamaru won the fight knockout, dropping Kazuki with a left straight less than two minutes into the fight.

Tamaru made his first title defense against the second ranked RISE super flyweight contender Jin Mandokoro at RISE 132 on May 19, 2019. Tamaru won the fight by unanimous decision, with two scorecards of 49–48 and one scorecard of 50–48.

Following his first successful title defense, Tamaru faced the reigning RISE Bantamweight champion Masahiko Suzuki in a non-title bout at Rise World Series 2019 Final Round on September 16, 2019. Tamaru's ten fight winning streak came to an end, as Suzuki won the fight by an extra round decision.

Tamaru faced Masaking in another non-title bout at Rise on Abema on July 12, 2020. Tamaru won the fight by unanimous decision, with all three judges scoring the fight 30–28 in his favor.

Tamaru was booked to make his second title defense against Kazuki Osaki at RISE 142 on September 4, 2020. Osaki won the fight by unanimous decision, with scores of 49–47, 49–47 and 50–47.

RISE Dead or Alive tournament
Tamaru was booked to fight Jin Mandokoro in the quarterfinals of the 2021 RISE Dead or Alive 53 kg Tournament. The two of them previously faced each other on May 19, 2019, with Tamaru winning by unanimous decision. He lost the rematch by unanimous decision, with scores of 30–27, 30–27 and 30–28.

RISE Flyweight champion
Tamaru was booked to face Kuryu at RISE 157 on April 24, 2022, in the semifinals of the 2022 RISE flyweight tournament, which was held to crown the inaugural RISE flyweight champion. The fight ended in a no contest in the first round due to doctor stoppage following a head clash in which Tamaru got his nose broken. The bout was rescheduled for RISE 161, which took place on August 28, 2022, but was postponed on August 17, as Kuryu withdrew after contracting COVID-19. The bout was later scrapped and Tamaru was instead booked to face Riku Kazushima for the inaugural RISE Flyweight (-51.5 kg) title at RISE 162 on October 30, 2022. Tamaru captured the title by unanimous decision, with all three judges scoring the bout 49–48 in his favor.

Tamaru faced Khunsuknoy Boomdeksean at RISE 164 on January 28, 2023, in his return to the super flyweight division. He won the fight by majority decision, with scores of 30–29, 29–29 and 30–28.

Tamaru faced Kazane Nagai in a -54 kg catchweight bout, which served as a qulifier for the 2023 RISE World Series, at RISE EL DORADO 2023 on March 26, 2023.

Titles and accomplishments

Professional
RISE
 2018 RISE Super Flyweight (-53 kg) Championship 
 2022 RISE Flyweight (-51.5 kg) Championship

Amateur
 2012 MA Jr. Kick -28 kg Champion
 2012 Bigbang -28 kg Champion
 2012 Bigbang -31 kg Champion
 2013 Bigbang -34 kg Champion
 2013 Bigbang -37 kg Tournament Champion
 2014 Bigbang -37 kg Champion
 2014 Bigbang -40 kg Champion
 2014 Shootboxing All Japan Junior -45 kg Champion
 2015 BigBang -50 kg Champion
 2015 KAMINARIMON All Japan Junior -55 kg Champion
 2016 J-NETWORK Bantamweight Tournament Champion
 2016 K-1 All Japan A-Class -55 kg Champion
 2016 Bigbang -55 kg Champion

Kickboxing record

|-  style="text-align:center; background:#"
| 2023-03-26 || ||align=left| Kazane || RISE ELDORADO 2023 || Tokyo, Japan ||  || ||
|-
|-  style="background:#cfc;"
| 2023-01-28 || Win ||align=left| Khunsuknoy Boomdeksian || RISE 164 || Tokyo, Japan || Decision (Majority) || 3 || 3:00
|-
|-  style="background:#cfc;"
| 2022-10-30 || Win ||align=left| Riku Kazushima || RISE 162 || Tokyo, Japan|| Decision (Unanimous) ||  5|| 3:00 
|-
! style=background:white colspan=9 |
|-  style="background:#c5d2ea;"
| 2022-04-24 ||NC||align=left| Kuryu|| RISE 157, Flyweight Championship Tournament, Semi Final || Tokyo, Japan|| Doctor stoppage (Head clash) || 1 ||  
|-  style="background:#fbb;"
| 2021-07-18|| Loss ||align=left| Jin Mandokoro || RISE WORLD SERIES 2021 - Dead or Alive Tournament, Quarter Final || Osaka, Japan || Decision (Unanimous) || 3 ||3:00
|-  style="background:#fbb;"
| 2020-09-04 ||Loss ||align=left| Kazuki Osaki|| RISE 142 || Tokyo, Japan|| Decision (Unanimous)|| 5 || 3:00 
|-
! style=background:white colspan=9 |
|-  style="background:#cfc;"
| 2020-07-12|| Win ||align=left| Masaking || Rise on Abema || Tokyo, Japan || Decision (Unanimous) || 3 || 3:00
|-  style="background:#FFBBBB;"
| 2019-09-16||Loss ||align=left| Masahiko Suzuki || Rise World Series 2019 Final Round || Chiba, Japan ||Ext.R Decision (Unanimous) || 4 ||3:00
|-  style="background:#CCFFCC;"
| 2019-05-19|| Win ||align=left| Jin Mandokoro || RISE 132 || Tokyo, Japan || Decision (Unanimous) || 5 || 3:00
|-
! style=background:white colspan=9 |
|-  style="background:#CCFFCC;"
| 2019-02-03|| Win ||align=left| Kazuki || RISE 130 || Tokyo, Japan || KO (Left Straight) || 1 || 1:56
|-  style="background:#CCFFCC;"
| 2018-11-02|| Win ||align=left| Azusa Kaneko || RISE 128 || Tokyo, Japan || Decision (Unanimous) || 5 || 3:00 
|-
! style=background:white colspan=9 |
|-  style="background:#CCFFCC;"
| 2018-09-16|| Win ||align=left| Yuya Hayashi || RISE 127 || Tokyo, Japan || Decision (Unanimous) || 3 || 3:00
|-  style="background:#CCFFCC;"
| 2018-07-16|| Win ||align=left| KING Takeshi || RISE 126 || Tokyo, Japan || Decision (Unanimous) || 3 || 3:00
|-  style="background:#CCFFCC;"
| 2018-05-25|| Win ||align=left| Shota Toyama || RISE 124 || Tokyo, Japan || Decision (Unanimous)|| 3 || 3:00
|-  style="background:#CCFFCC;"
| 2018-02-18|| Win ||align=left| Kiyoshi || BigBang 32|| Tokyo, Japan || Decision (Unanimous) || 3 || 3:00
|-  style="background:#CCFFCC;"
| 2017-12-03|| Win ||align=left| Shuto Hagiwara || BigBang 31|| Tokyo, Japan || Decision (Unanimous) || 3 || 3:00
|-  style="background:#CCFFCC;"
| 2017-09-03|| Win ||align=left| Keiichi Iio || BigBang 30 || Tokyo, Japan || KO || 3 || 2:20
|-
| colspan=9 | Legend:    

|-  style="background:#FFBBBB;"
| 2017-07-29|| Loss ||align=left| Tatsuya Tsubakihara || K-1 Koshien 2017 –55 kg Tournament, Semi Final || Tokyo, Japan || Ext.R Decision (Majority)|| 2 || 2:00
|-  style="background:#CCFFCC;"
| 2017-07-29|| Win ||align=left| Teruku Maezono || K-1 Koshien 2017 –55 kg Tournament, Quarter Final || Tokyo, Japan ||  Decision (Majority)|| 1 || 2:00
|-  style="background:#CCFFCC;"
| 2017-07-29|| Win ||align=left| Kaito Nagashima || K-1 Koshien 2017 –55 kg Tournament, Second Round || Tokyo, Japan ||  Decision (Unanimous)|| 1 || 2:00
|-  style="background:#FFBBBB;"
| 2017-04-29|| Loss ||align=left| Haruki Ohno || K-1 Challenge A-Class -55 kg Tournament, Final || Tokyo, Japan ||  Decision (Unanimous) || 1 || 2:00
|-  style="background:#CCFFCC;"
| 2017-04-29|| Win ||align=left| Riamu Sera || K-1 Challenge A-Class -55 kg Tournament, Semi Final || Tokyo, Japan ||  Decision (Unanimous) || 1 || 2:00
|-  style="background:#CCFFCC;"
| 2016-12-11|| Win ||align=left| Tetsuji Noda || K-1 Amateur Challenge A-Class -55 kg Tournament, Final || Tokyo, Japan ||  Decision (Unanimous)|| 3 || 2:00
|-
! style=background:white colspan=9 |
|-  style="background:#CCFFCC;"
| 2016-12-11|| Win ||align=left| Retsu Akabane || K-1 Amateur Challenge A-Class -55 kg Tournament, Semi Final || Tokyo, Japan ||  Decision (Unanimous)|| 2 || 2:00
|-  style="background:#FFBBBB;"
| 2016-10-23|| Loss||align=left| Tetsuji Noda || K-1 Amateur All Japan Preliminary Tournament, Semi Final || Tokyo, Japan ||  Decision (Unanimous)|| 1 || 2:00
|-  style="background:#CCFFCC;"
| 2016-10-23|| Win ||align=left| Hiroki Nishimura || K-1 Amateur All Japan Preliminary Tournament, Quarter Final || Tokyo, Japan ||  Decision (Unanimous)|| 1 || 2:00
|-  style="background:#CCFFCC;"
| 2016-09-04|| Win ||align=left| Ryusei Iwagawa || BigBang 26 || Tokyo, Japan ||  Decision || 3 || 2:00
|-
! style=background:white colspan=9 |
|-  style="background:#CCFFCC;"
| 2016-06-28|| Win ||align=left|  || BigBang  || Tokyo, Japan ||  Decision || 3 || 2:00
|-
! style=background:white colspan=9 |
|-  style="background:#CCFFCC;"
| 2016-05-29|| Win ||align=left| Fuminori Muroki ||J-Network J-GROW in SHINJUKU～vol.5, -53 kg Tournament, Final || Japan ||  KO (Punches) ||  || 0:21
|-
! style=background:white colspan=9 |
|-  style="background:#CCFFCC;"
| 2016-05-29|| Win ||align=left| Kaito Nagashima ||J-Network J-GROW in SHINJUKU～vol.5, -53 kg Tournament, Semi Final || Japan ||  KO ||  || 2:43
|-  style="background:#CCFFCC;"
| 2016-05-29|| Win ||align=left| Yuya Hayashi ||J-Network J-GROW in SHINJUKU～vol.5, -53 kg Tournament, Quarter FInal || Japan ||  Decision (Unanimous)|| 1 || 2:00
|-  style="background:#CCFFCC;"
| 2016-02-21|| Win ||align=left| Michitaka Yamaguchi || BigBang 24 || Tokyo, Japan ||  Decision || 3 || 2:00
|-
! style=background:white colspan=9 |
|-  style="background:#cfc;"
| 2015-12-06|| Win ||align=left| Jukiya Ito || Bigbang Amateur || Tokyo, Japan ||  Decision || 2 || 1:30
|-  style="background:#c5d2ea;"
| 2015-11-15|| Draw ||align=left| Ikko Ota || Bigbang the future 15 || Tokyo, Japan ||  Decision || 3 || 1:30
|-
! style=background:white colspan=9 |
|-  style="background:#CCFFCC;"
| 2015-09-20|| Win ||align=left| Hayato Mizoguchi ||KAMINARIMON All Japan, Final || Tokyo, Japan ||  Decision (Unanimous) || 2 || 2:00
|-
! style=background:white colspan=9 |
|-  style="background:#CCFFCC;"
| 2015-09-20|| Win ||align=left| Ruka Hosoda ||KAMINARIMON All Japan, Semi Final || Tokyo, Japan ||  Decision (Unanimous) || 2 || 2:00
|-  style="background:#CCFFCC;"
| 2015-09-06|| Win ||align=left| Shinnosuke Hatsuda ||BigBang Amateur || Tokyo, Japan ||  Decision || 3 || 1:30
|-
! style=background:white colspan=9 |
|-  style="background:#fbb;"
| 2015-04-29 || Loss||align=left| Ikko Ota || NJKF EXPLOSION 1|| Tokyo, Japan || Decision || 2 || 1:30
|-  style="background:#FFBBBB;"
| 2015-02-22|| Loss ||align=left| Haruto Yasumoto ||All Japan Jr. Kick Kanto Selection Tournament, Fnal || Tokyo, Japan ||  Decision || 3 || 1:30
|-  style="background:#CCFFCC;"
| 2015-02-15|| Win ||align=left| Ikko Ota ||BigBang || Tokyo, Japan ||  Decision || 2 || 2:00
|-  style="background:#cfc;"
| 2014-12-23 || Win||align=left| Tomoki Miyashita  || Amateur REBELS BLOW-CUP.34, Final|| Tokyo, Japan ||Decision (Majority)  ||  ||
|-  style="background:#CCFFCC;"
| 2014-12-21|| Win ||align=left| Kyo Kawakami ||Amateur Shootboxing || Tokyo, Japan ||  Decision (Unanimous) || 2 || 2:00
|-
! style=background:white colspan=9 |
|-  style="background:#FFBBBB;"
| 2014-12-14|| Loss||align=left| Ikko Ota || BOM Amateur 8 || Yokohama, Japan ||  Decision || 3 || 2:00
|-  style="background:#FFBBBB;"
| 2014-10-19|| Loss ||align=left| Ryutaro Uchida || K-1 Challenge 2014, Junior B-Class Tournament Final || Tokyo, Japan ||  Decision (Unanimous)|| 2 || 2:00
|-  style="background:#CCFFCC;"
| 2014-10-19|| Win ||align=left| Daiki Mine || K-1 Challenge 2014, Junior B-Class Tournament Semi Final || Tokyo, Japan ||  Decision (Majority)|| 1 || 2:00
|- style="background:#cfc;"
| 2014-09-07|| Win || align="left" | Jukiya Ito || Bigbang Amateur 23 ||Tokyo, Japan|| Decision || 3 || 1:30 
|-
! style=background:white colspan=9 |
|- style="background:#fbb;"
| 2014-06-29||Loss || align="left" | Ryutaro Uchida ||Muay Thai WINDY Super Fight vol.16, Quarter Final ||Tokyo, Japan|| Decision  ||  ||
|-  style="background:#FFBBBB;"
| 2014-06-01|| Loss ||align=left| Ryutaro Uchida || BigBang Amateur 21 || Tokyo, Japan ||  Decision || 3 || 2:00
|-
! style=background:white colspan=9 |
|-  style="background:#fbb;"
| 2014-05-06 || Loss||align=left| Haruto Yasumoto || BOM Amateur 6, -40 kg Championship Tournament Final ||  Tokyo, Japan ||Decision || 2 || 2:00
|-
! style=background:white colspan=9 |
|-  style="background:#cfc;"
| 2014-05-06 || Win||align=left| Taison Suzuki || BOM Amateur 6, -40 kg Championship Tournament Semi Final ||  Tokyo, Japan ||Decision || 2 || 2:00
|-  style="background:#cfc;"
| 2014-05-06 || Win||align=left| Michiharu Nara || BOM Amateur 6, -40 kg Championship Tournament Quarter Final ||  Tokyo, Japan ||Decision || 2 || 2:00
|-  style="background:#cfc;"
| 2014-04-13 || Win||align=left| Tatsu Nagai|| BOM Amateur 5 ||  Tokyo, Japan ||Decision || 2 || 2:00
|-  style="background:#cfc;"
| 2014-03-23|| Win ||align=left| Shinnosuke Yamada || JAKF SMASHERS 163 || Tokyo, Japan ||  KO  || 2 ||
|-  style="background:#FFBBBB;"
| 2014-03-16|| Loss ||align=left| Haruto Yasumoto || REBELS.25 || Tokyo, Japan ||  Decision || 2 || 2:00
|-  style="background:#cfc;"
| 2014-02-23|| Win||align=left| Riichi Hosono || Bigbang Amateur 19 || Tokyo, Japan ||  Decision || 3 || 2:00
|-
! style=background:white colspan=9 |
|-  style="background:#CCFFCC;"
| 2014-01-19|| Win ||align=left| Shogo Nakajima ||BOM Battle of Muay Thai Amateur 4|| Tokyo, Japan ||  Decision ||2|| 2:00
|-  style="background:#CCFFCC;"
| 2014-01-19|| Win ||align=left| Tatsumi Nagai ||BOM Battle of Muay Thai Amateur 4|| Tokyo, Japan ||  Decision ||2|| 2:00
|-  style="background:#FFBBBB;"
| 2013-12-01|| Loss ||align=left| Ryutaro Uchida || BigBang Amateur 18|| Tokyo, Japan ||  Decision ||3|| 2:00 
|-
! style=background:white colspan=9 |
|-  style="background:#CCFFCC;"
| 2013-11-04|| Win ||align=left| Ayano Ohara || Windy Super Fight vol.15|| Tokyo, Japan ||  Decision ||2|| 2:00
|-  style="background:#CCFFCC;"
| 2013-10-13|| Win ||align=left| Riichi Hoshino || BigBang Amateur 17, Final|| Tokyo, Japan ||  Decision ||3|| 2:00 
|-
! style=background:white colspan=9 |
|-  style="background:#CCFFCC;"
| 2013-10-13|| Win ||align=left| || BigBang Amateur 17, Semi Final || Tokyo, Japan ||  Decision ||2|| 2:00
|-  style="background:#FFBBBB;"
| 2013-09-08|| Loss ||align=left| Yuuta Sasaki || BOM Battle of Muay Thai Amateur 2 || Tokyo, Japan ||  Decision ||2 || 2:00
|-  style="background:#CCFFCC;"
| 2013-09-01|| Win||align=left| Hyuga Ishibe || BigBang 14 || Tokyo, Japan ||  Decision ||2 || 2:00
|-  style="background:#FFBBBB;"
| 2013-07-14|| Loss ||align=left| Ryu Kanno || BigBang Amateur 15 || Tokyo, Japan ||  Decision ||3 || 2:00 
|-
! style=background:white colspan=9 |
|-  style="background:#CCFFCC;"
| 2013-06-02|| Win ||align=left| Reiji Nakamura || BigBang Amateur 14 || Tokyo, Japan ||  KO ||  ||
|-  style="background:#CCFFCC;"
| 2013-05-12|| Win ||align=left| Kojiro Vanhoose || BOM Battle of Muay Thai Amateur, Final || Tokyo, Japan ||  Decision || 2 || 2:00
|-  style="background:#CCFFCC;"
| 2013-05-12|| Win ||align=left| Asahi Shinagawa || BOM Battle of Muay Thai Amateur, Semi Final || Tokyo, Japan ||  Decision || 2 || 2:00
|-  style="background:#CCFFCC;"
| 2013-05-12|| Win ||align=left| Ryu Kanno || BOM Battle of Muay Thai Amateur, Quarter Final || Tokyo, Japan ||  Decision || 2 || 2:00
|-  style="background:#CCFFCC;"
| 2013-05-05|| Win ||align=left| Ikko Oota|| Bigbang the future VI || Tokyo, Japan ||  Decision || 3 || 2:00 
|-
! style=background:white colspan=9 |
|-  style="background:#CCFFCC;"
| 2013-04-07|| Win ||align=left| Hyoga || REBELS Blow Cup 15 || Tokyo, Japan ||  Decision || 2 || 2:00
|-  style="background:#fbb;"
| 2013-03-17||Loss ||align=left| Haruto Yasumoto || MA Kick BREAK-35 || Tokyo, Japan ||  Decision || 3 || 1:30
|-
! style=background:white colspan=9 |
|-  style="background:#CCFFCC;"
| 2013-03-10|| Win ||align=left| Ryuya Koyama|| Bigbang the future VI || Tokyo, Japan ||  Decision || 3 || 2:00 
|-
! style=background:white colspan=9 |
|-  style="background:#cfc;"
| 2013|| Win||align=left| Arai || TNT Amateur YZD Gym || Tokyo, Japan ||  Decision ||  ||
|-  style="background:#c5d2ea;"
| 2013|| Draw ||align=left| Nadaka Yoshinari || TNT Amateur YZD Gym || Tokyo, Japan ||  Decision ||  ||
|-  style="background:#CCFFCC;"
| 2012-12-23|| Win ||align=left| Hyoga Okada || REBELS Blow Cup 12 || Tokyo, Japan ||  Decision || 2 || 2:00
|-  style="background:#CCFFCC;"
| 2012-11-11|| Win ||align=left| Jukiya Ito || Jawin presents Bigbang the future V || Tokyo, Japan ||  Decision ||  || 
|-
! style=background:white colspan=9 |
|-  style="background:#CCFFCC;"
| 2012-10-28|| Win ||align=left| Hyoga Okada || REBELS || Tokyo, Japan ||  Decision || 2 || 2:00
|-  style="background:#fbb;"
| 2012-10-21|| Loss||align=left| Takito || M-1 Muay Thai Amateur 54, Semi Final || Tokyo, Japan ||  Decision ||  ||
|-  style="background:#CCFFCC;"
| 2012-08-26|| Win ||align=left| Ryuya Okuwaki || MA Japan Kickboxing Break 28 || Tokyo, Japan ||  Decision || 3 || 1:30
|-
! style=background:white colspan=9 |
|-  style="background:#CCFFCC;"
| 2012-07-16|| Win ||align=left| Hibiki Sometani || BigBang || Tokyo, Japan ||  Decision || 2 || 1:30
|-  style="background:#CCFFCC;"
| 2012-07-01|| Win ||align=left| Yumu Ito || REBELS Blow Cup 7 || Tokyo, Japan ||  Decision || 2 || 1:30
|-  style="background:#FFBBBB;"
| 2012-06-03|| Loss ||align=left| Ikko Ota || BigBang Amateur Event || Tokyo, Japan ||  Decision || 2 || 1:30
|-
| colspan=9 | Legend:

See also
 List of male kickboxers

References

Living people
2002 births
Japanese male kickboxers
Sportspeople from Tokyo